The Orson Welles Almanac (also known as Radio Almanac and The Orson Welles Comedy Show) is a 1944 CBS Radio series directed and hosted by Orson Welles. Broadcast live on the Columbia Pacific Network, the 30-minute variety program was heard Wednesdays at 9:30 p.m. ET January 26 – July 19, 1944. The series was sponsored by Mobilgas and Mobiloil. Many of the shows originated from U.S. military camps, where Welles and his repertory company and guests entertained the troops with a reduced version of The Mercury Wonder Show. The performances of the all-star jazz band that Welles brought together for the show were an important force in the revival of traditional New Orleans jazz in the 1940s.

Production

"The Orson Welles Almanac was a format that intrigued Welles throughout the early 1940s," wrote radio historian John Dunning. "It consisted of everything from odd facts to jazz."

The idea of doing such a variety show occurred to Welles after his success as substitute host of The Jack Benny Program, radio's most popular show. When Jack Benny contracted pneumonia on a performance tour of military bases, Welles hosted four consecutive programs (March 14–April 4, 1943) and was Benny's first guest when he returned to the show April 11, 1943.

Orson Welles's variety show was auditioned in New York December 2, 1943, with the Compton advertising agency representing Mobilgas. The cast included Welles (host) and Duke Ellington (music), with guest spots by Rita Hayworth and Jimmy Durante on an audition record. Billboard reported that plans were under way for scheduling the show.

The 30-minute program was heard Wednesdays at 9:30 p.m. ET January 26 – July 19, 1944. The wartime variety show presented readings from classic works, drama, music, sketch comedy, magic, mindreading and personal commentary by Welles. Many of the shows originated from U.S. military camps where Welles and his repertory company and guests entertained the troops with a reduced version of The Mercury Wonder Show. The program aired on the Columbia Pacific Network, heard in California and neighboring states, but no further east than Denver.

"Originating in Los Angeles, the program was only aired regionally, not at all in New York," wrote Welles biographer Bret Wood. "Had it been a major network presentation, there might have been enough publicity to build a successful program, for the content and production are both of a quality far above the norm."

Welles had an ongoing battle with the program's sponsor, Mobil, which shortened the life of the series. For example, Welles bristled at a suggestion that if Duke Ellington appeared on the show he should play the role of Welles's servant.

Twenty-six broadcasts were produced; all but three shows have survived in private collections and in the Welles archives at the Lilly Library.

All Star Jazz Group

A passionate and knowledgeable fan of traditional New Orleans jazz, Welles was part of the social network of Hollywood's Jazz Man Record Shop, a business that opened in 1939 and was instrumental in the worldwide revival of original jazz in the 1940s. In February 1944 Welles asked Marili Morden, proprietor of Jazz Man Records, to put together an authentic jazz band for The Orson Welles Almanac.

Within minutes Morden assembled Mutt Carey (trumpet), Ed Garland (bass), Jimmie Noone (clarinet), Kid Ory (trombone), Bud Scott (guitar), Zutty Singleton (drums) and Buster Wilson (piano). Noone and Singleton were the only two musicians who were working regularly. The Depression and the popularity of swing and big band music had forced many jazz musicians out of the business. When Morden and her first husband, Jazz Man founder David Stuart, first discovered Ory in Los Angeles in 1940, he had been retired from music for seven years. He had been sorting mail at the post office, working on his brother's chicken ranch, and gardening at his home. When clarinetist Barney Bigard asked him to join his band in 1942, Ory was sweeping out the city morgue for $12 a week. "I guess, to be truthful, that there was a lot of New Orleans dixieland players working that couldn't find a job for years," Bigard recalled.

"I'll never forget the first day the band rehearsed," recalled Nesuhi Ertegun, who became Morden's business partner and later her husband:

Welles came into the studio with his entourage and asked me to introduce him to the musicians. I took him around to everyone. But Ory was hard of hearing. He said, "What'd you say the name was?" I thought to myself, "Well, we're out of this job now." But Welles said, "Mr. Ory, I'm a great admirer of yours, I have all your records and those where you play with Louis Armstrong and the Hot Seven."

Welles became friends with each of the musicians and the band rehearsed at his home before each show. The All Star Jazz Group (which Welles often called the All Star Jazz Combination or the Mercury All Star Jazz Combination) first performed on The Orson Welles Almanac on March 15, 1944. Its last performance was July 12, 1944, on the penultimate show in the series. The performances on Welles's show were so popular that the band became a regular feature, launched Ory's comeback, and was an important force in reviving interest in New Orleans jazz.

On the morning of the fifth broadcast, April 19, 1944, Jimmie Noone suddenly died at home of a heart attack, aged 48. Welles telephoned Ory and told him of Noone's death, and asked him to write a blues that could be performed for that evening's radio program. "See if you can work one up," Welles said. "We'll call it 'Blues for Jimmie'."

In 1952 Ory reflected on writing the tune, which had become a regular feature for his band and was regarded a classic. "I got up right away and began blowing some blues on my horn. I was real sad; Jimmie was my best friend," Ory said. "I found a man to fill in for Jimmie on clarinet. Then I got the band together that afternoon and we rehearsed the tune. On the show that night Mr. Welles explained the situation over the air. I don't mind saying that when we played 'Blues for Jimmie' all the musicians in the band were crying. So was Mr. Welles, and the audience, too."

On the program that evening, Welles spoke extemporaneously for three minutes about Noone while Buster Wilson and Bud Scott played "Sweet Lorraine", Noone's theme song, in the background. As he did every time the All Star Jazz Group appeared, Welles introduced each musician by name, and that night he introduced New Orleans-born clarinetist Wade Whaley, sitting in for Noone.

Clarinetist Barney Bigard was brought in to play with the All Star Jazz Group for the remainder of the series. Bigard called Welles "a real swell fellow. He loved jazz and had a great knowledge of it. We used to go up to his house after the broadcasts and he would tell me things about my career that I had forgotten myself."

Nesuhi Ertegun founded his first record label, Crescent Records, with the express purpose of recording the All Star Jazz Group featured on The Orson Welles Almanac. Only eight discs were released on the Crescent label, all of them recorded August–November 1944 by the group Ertegun renamed Kid Ory's Creole Jazz Band.

"Viewed in perspective," Ertegun later wrote, "they are among the most significant jazz records ever made: they gave eloquent proof of the continuing vitality of New Orleans jazz at a time when such proof was needed."

"With Your Wings"
Broadcast July 19, 1944, from the Coast Guard camp in Long Beach, California, the final episode of The Orson Welles Almanac ends with a five-minute reading by Welles, "a short story, especially written for me to broadcast by one of the first talents in American literature, John Steinbeck." The story, "With Your Wings", relates the homecoming of a decorated pilot, later revealed to be black, and his realization of the meaning that his achievement has for his family and community. Virtually forgotten, the story was unpublished until November 2014, after a transcript of the broadcast was found in the archives of the University of Texas at Austin by the managing editor of The Strand Magazine. "With Your Wings" was published in the quarterly magazine's holiday issue.

Welles had previously presented "With Your Wings" January 25, 1943, on his CBS radio series Ceiling Unlimited. The script and recording are included with the Orson Welles materials at the Lilly Library.

Episodes

Notes

References

See also
Orson Welles radio credits

External links
 Orson Welles Almanac — Part 1 at the Internet Archive
 Orson Welles Almanac — Part 2 at the Internet Archive
 1944 Orson Welles Broadcasts at The Kid Ory Archive

1940s American radio programs
1944 radio programme debuts
1944 radio programme endings
American variety radio programs
CBS Radio programs
Works by Orson Welles